Joe is a masculine given name, usually a short form (hypocorism) of Joseph.

Notable persons with the name Joe include:

People
 Joe Alexander (born 1986), American-Israeli basketball player in the Israel Basketball Premier League
 Joe Alwyn (born 1991), British actor
 Joe Amato (disambiguation), several people
 Joe Anoa'i (born 1985), known professionally as Roman Reigns, American wrestler, actor and former college football player
 Joe Arpaio (born 1932), American law enforcement officer and politician
 Joe Ashman (born 1995), English actor
 Joe Bachie (born 1998), American football player
 Joe Becker (disambiguation), several people
 Joe Biden (born 1942), 46th and current president of the United States (2021–present); 47th vice president of the United States (2009–2017); U.S. senator from Delaware (1973–2009)
 Joseph "Joe" Biden Sr. (1915–2002), father of Joe Biden
 Joe Black (1924–2002), American baseball pitcher
 Joe Black (drag queen) (born 1989), British musician and drag queen
 Joe Blackburn (born 1979), American ice hockey player
 Joe Blackett (1875–?), English footballer
 Joe Blackledge (1928–2008), English cricketer
 Joe Blackman (born 1984), British entrepreneur
 Joe Borowski (baseball) (born 1971), American sports broadcaster and former baseball pitcher
 Joe Borowski (politician) (1933–1996), Canadian politician
 Joe Brown (disambiguation), several people
 Joe Buck (born 1969), American sports announcer
 Joe Budden (born 1980), American rapper
 Joe Burrow (born 1996), American football player
 Joe Calzaghe (born 1972), Welsh boxer
 Joe Cinque (died 1997), Australian murder victim
 Joe Clark (born 1939), 16th Prime Minister of Canada 1979–1980
 Joe Cocker (1944–2014), British singer 
 Joe Coleman (disambiguation), several people
 Joe Connor (disambiguation), several people
 Joe Costello (politician) (born 1945), Irish politician
 Joe Courtney (basketball) (born 1969), American basketball player
 Joe Courtney (politician) (born 1953), American politician
 Joe Craft (born 1950), American businessman and philanthropist
 Joe Dassin (1938–1980), French singer
 Joe Davis (disambiguation), several people
 Joe Dawson (disambiguation), several people
 Joe DeLamielleure (born 1951), American football player
 Joe DeRita (1909–1993), American and actor 
 Joe DiMaggio (1914–1999), American baseball player
 Joe Duttine (born 1974), English actor
 Joe Egan (musician) (born 1946), Scottish musician
 Joe Egan (Paralympian) (born 1953), Australian athlete and volleyballer
 Joe Egan (rugby league) (1919–2012), English rugby league footballer and coach
 Joe Esposito (disambiguation), several people
 Joe Farrell (disambiguation), several people
 Joe Flacco (born 1985), American football player
 Joe Frazier (1944–2011), American boxer
 Joe Gaziano (born 1996), American football player
 Joe Giglio (born 1967/8), Maltese politician
 Joe Giles-Harris (born 1997), American football player
 Joe Gomez (footballer) (born 1997), English footballer
 Joe Gomez (wrestler) (born 1973), American professional wrestler
 Joe Graf Jr. (born 1998), American racing driver
 Joe Greene (born 1946), American football player
 Joe Gatto, American comedian, actor and producer, former member of comedy troupe The Tenderloins
 Joe Hahn, American musician
 Joe Harris (disambiguation), several people
 Joe Hawley, guitarist for the band Tally Hall
 Joe Healy (born 1986), English footballer
 Joe Hisaishi (born 1950), Japanese composer and musical director
 Joe Horlen (1937-2022), American baseball pitcher
 Joe Horn Jr. (born 1994), American football player
 Joe Ingles (born 1987), Australian basketball player
 Joe Ironstone (1898–1972), Canadian ice hockey player 
 Joe Jackson (disambiguation), several people
 Joe Jacobson (born 1986), Welsh footballer
 Joe Johnson (disambiguation), several people
 Joe Jonas, American musician
 Joe Jones (disambiguation), several people
 Joe Kapp (born 1938), American and Canadian football player
 Joe Kelly (disambiguation), several people
 Joseph "Joe" P. Kennedy Sr. (1888–1969), American businessman and politician, father of US President John F. Kennedy
 Joseph "Joe" P. Kennedy Jr. (1915–1944), American naval aviator, son of the above
 Joe Kennedy III (born 1980), American lawyer and politician from Massachusetts
 Joe Lala (1947–2014), American musician, founding member of the rock band Blues Image
 Joe Lieberman (born 1942), American politician
 Joe Locke (actor) (born 2003), Manx actor
 Joe Louis (disambiguation), several people
 Joe Lydon (boxer) (1878–1937), American boxer and soccer player
 Joe Lydon (rugby) (born 1963), English rugby league footballer and rugby union coach
 Joe Lynch (actor) (1925–2001), Irish actor
 Joe Lynch (boxer) (1898–1965), American boxer
 Joe Lynch (director), American film and music video director
 Joe Martin (disambiguation), several people
 Joe McConnell (1939–2018), American sports announcer
 Joe McElderry (born 1991), British singer
 Joe Maddon (born 1954), American professional baseball manager
 Joe Mauer (born 1983), American baseball player
 Joe Millikan (born 1950), American racing driver
 Joe Mixon (born 1996), American football player
 Joe Montana (born 1956), American football player
 Joe "Pegleg" Morgan (1929–1993), American fugitive
 Joe Musgrove (born 1992), American professional baseball player
 Joe Namath (born 1943), American football player
 Joe O'Donnell (disambiguation), several people
 Joe Ostman (born 1995), American football player
 Joe Pasternack (born 1977), American basketball coach
 Joe Pavelski, American ice hockey player
 Joe Penna (born 1987), Brazilian musician and filmmaker
 Joe Pera, American comedian
 Joe Perry (American football) (1927–2011), American football player
 Joe Perry (musician) (born 1950), stage name of American musician Anthony Joseph Pereira
 Joe Perry (snooker player) (born 1974), English snooker player
 Joe Pesci (born 1943), American actor
 Joe Pisarcik (born 1952), American football player
 Joe Powell (American football) (born 1994), American football player
 Joe Quinn (disambiguation), several people
 Joe Ragland (born 1989), American-Liberian basketball player for Hapoel Holon of the Israeli Basketball Premier League
 Joe Raposo, American music composer
 Joe Reed (disambiguation), several people
 Joe Riley (disambiguation), several people
 Joe Rogan (born 1967), American comedian
 Joe Root (born 1990), English cricketer
 Joe Rowe (American football) (born 1973), American football player
 Joe Sakic (born 1969), Canadian ice hockey player
 Joe Santagato (born 1992), American entertainer
 Joe Saenz (born 1975), American fugitive
 Joe Sayers (cricketer) (born 1983), English cricketer
 Joe Tait (1937–2021), American sports broadcaster
 Joe Theismann (born 1949), American football player
 Joe Thomas (disambiguation), several people
 Joe Thornton (born 1979), Canadian-American ice hockey player
 Joe Trohman (born 1984), American guitarist, singer, and record producer
 Joe Turner (disambiguation), several people
 Joe Walsh (born 1947), American rock guitarist, singer, and songwriter
 Joe Webb (born 1986), American football player
 Joe Williams (disambiguation), several people
 Joe the Plumber, American conservative activist and commentator Samuel Joseph Wurzelbacher (born 1973)
 Joe Satriani (born 1956), American guitarist
 Peg Leg Joe, legendary sailor and underground railroad conductor whose existence is disputed

Persons with the middle name
 Danny Joe Brown (1951–2005), American singer, member of the Southern rock band Molly Hatchet
 Billy Joe Royal (1942–2015), American singer
 Tommy Joe Martins (born 1986), American racing driver
 Tony Joe White (1943–2018), American singer-songwriter
 Joe Gliniewicz, corrupt cop and army officer who staged his murder; it was actually suicide
 Billie Joe Armstrong, guitarist and singer of American punk rock band Green Day

Fictional characters
 Banana Joe, in Cartoon Network's series The Amazing World of Gumball
 Glass Joe, a fictional French boxer from the Punch-Out!! series 
 Joe, a character in the 1986 American fantasy drama film The Boy Who Could Fly
 Joe, the nickname of the Man with No Name, from A Fistful of Dollars
 Joe Barker, a character in the 1986 TV action movie The Gladiator
 Joe Bruin, the official mascot of the University of California, Los Angeles
 Judge Joe Dredd, British comics character
 Joe Gibken, A Main Character in Japanese Series Kaizoku Sentai Gokaiger
 Joe Goldberg, main character of the psychological thriller novel and television series You
 Joe Higashi, in the video game Fatal Fury
 Joe Kido, A Main Character In Digimon Adventure
 Joe McClaine, protagonist of Joe 90, a 1968 British television series
 Joe Lynch (Home and Away), on the Australian soap opera Home and Away
 Joe Shmoe, an often-used fictional name like John Doe
 Karate Joe, from the Rhythm Heaven video game series

See also
 Jo (given name)

English-language masculine given names
Hypocorisms
English masculine given names